Garner Ekstran (born September 1, 1941 in Bow, Washington) was a professional Canadian football defensive end and linebacker who played seven seasons for the Saskatchewan Roughriders and one more with the BC Lions.

Saskatchewan Roughriders
Garner Ekstran played defense for the Saskatchewan Roughriders from 1961 to 1967. Ekstran's solid play on defense helped the Roughriders win the Grey cup in 1966 against the Ottawa Rough Riders.

BC Lions
Eksrand finished his playing career with the Lions, spending one more year before retiring from professional football.

References

1939 births
Living people
BC Lions players
Canadian football defensive linemen
Canadian football linebackers
People from Bow, Washington
Players of American football from Washington (state)
Saskatchewan Roughriders players
Washington State Cougars football players